Factor 8: The Arkansas Prison Blood Scandal is a feature-length documentary by Arkansas filmmaker and investigative journalist Kelly Duda.   Through interviews and presentation of documents and footage, Duda alleges that for more than two decades, spanning the 1970s and 1980s, the Arkansas prison system profited from selling blood plasma from inmates infected with viral hepatitis and HIV. The documentary contends that thousands of victims who received transfusions of a blood product derived from these plasma products, Factor VIII, died as a result.

Factor 8 uses in-depth interviews and key documents as well as never-before-seen footage, to allege wrongdoing at the Arkansas state government, and at the United States federal level.

Factor 8 examines a prison blood-harvesting scheme run by prisoners to earn them an income; the blood was then sold by blood companies for millions of dollars. The harvested plasma was then shipped around the world, where it has been reported to have infected thousands of haemophilia patients. Haemophilia is a genetic condition which means that the person′s blood does not form clots.

Factor 8: The Arkansas Prison Blood Scandal was screened at Slamdance 2005 and at the American Film Institute′s Los Angeles Film Festival in November 2005. It won a special mention award at AFI and received a commendable review from critic John Anderson in the industry newspaper Variety.

After Cummins prisoner Rolf Kaestel became a key whistleblower in Duda’s documentary, state corrections officials abruptly whisked him off to Utah, where he’s been incarcerated ever since. “It is my firm belief that Rolf Kaestel became a political prisoner and was ‘disappeared’ for speaking out,” Duda told The Daily Beast.

In September 2021, Kaestel was finally paroled after been serving 40 years of his life imprisonment without parole sentence for robbing a taco hut with a water pistol of $264 in Ft. Smith, Arkansas, in 1981.  The victim, Dennis Schluterman, who was not harmed in the crime, has said for years that Kaestel should be freed. In Kaestel were paroled   Kaestel also has a contingent of high profile supporters that includes actress and MeToo activist Rose McGowan, CNN commentator Van Jones, music executive Jason Flom, and GOP fundraiser Jack Oliver. “There’s something fundamental to our justice system: the punishment should match the crime,” Duda said. “In this case, it makes absolutely no sense why he’s still there.”

Inquiries and legal actions
In the United States, lawyers have won settlements for 8,000 US haemophilia sufferers after they were given infected blood.

In 2002 the UK Government promised an inquiry if it was proven infected blood came from a US prison, although to date no inquiry has taken place. The UK Public Health Minister, Caroline Flint, has said: "We are aware that during the 1970s and 80s blood products were sourced from US prisoners" and the UK Haemophilia Society has called for a Public Inquiry.  The UK Government maintains that the Government of the day had acted in good faith and without the blood products many patients would have died.  In a letter to Lord Jenkin of Roding the Chief Executive of the National Health Service (NHS) informed Lord Jenkin that most files on contaminated NHS blood products which infected people with HIV and hepatitis C had been destroyed "in error". However, copies that were taken by legal entities in the UK at the time of previous litigation may mean the documentation can be retrieved and consequently assessed.

On November 3, 2005, Carolyn Leckie, Member of Scottish Parliament (MSP), tabled a motion highlighting the need for a wide audience for Factor 8: The Arkansas Prison Blood Scandal, in the light of the destruction of key documents. 22 MSPs signed the motion. Citing the documentary, the motion also called for a full independent public inquiry "to get to the truth of the circumstances that have caused horrendous levels of infection from blood products in the haemophiliac population."

In Canada, the federal government approved in July, 2006 a $1 billion compensation package for the so-called "forgotten victims" of tainted blood.
 Prior to this, the Canadian Red Cross pleaded guilty to criminal charges related to distributing tainted blood products and infecting Canadians with HIV and hepatitis C. The Royal Canadian Mounted Police blood task force has an ongoing investigation into the Arkansas sells.

In Japan tainted blood victims won two class-action lawsuits in 2006 against two Japanese pharmaceutical companies and the Japanese government. Japan also used blood harvested from the Arkansas Department of Correction. On March 23, 2007, the Tokyo District Court became the third court to rule in favor of more Hep-C suffering tainted blood victims,  awarding the plaintiffs 259 million yen. A fourth lawsuit victory for victims led to a compensation package by the   federal government for hundreds of victims and a formal apology from Prime Minister Yasuo Fukuda in December, 2007.

International exposure
A special screening of the film was held in Soho, London on May 5, 2006. On May 9, 2006, AIDS victims demonstrated against former US president Bill Clinton's (he was Governor of Arkansas during much of the period in which the blood factor sales had taken place) visit to Glasgow where he gave a speech about global politics. The British premiere of Factor 8 was held on September 29, 2006, as part of the 14th Raindance Film Festival in Piccadilly Circus, London.

In April 2007, the United Kingdom began a highly publicized public inquiry into contaminated blood, garnering significant media coverage.  In May, Scotland announced an impending inquiry of its own into tainted blood.

On July 11, 2007, Duda testified at the Lord Archer Inquiry on Contaminated Blood in Westminster, United Kingdom. The inquiry's aim was to uncover the British government's part in a scandal that led to thousands of infections and deaths. Duda gave evidence as to the United States' (and Arkansas's) role in the tragedy in what Lord Robert Winston has dubbed as "the worst treatment disaster in the history of the National Health Service".

On July 11. 2017, Prime Minister Theresa May ordered an inquiry in the UK into how contaminated blood in the 1970s and 1980s resulted in the deaths of at least 2,400 people and infected thousands more, an episode that members of Parliament have called “one of the worst peacetime disasters in Britain’s history.”

See also
 Bad Blood: A Cautionary Tale
 Contaminated haemophilia blood products
 Royal Commission of Inquiry on the Blood System in Canada
 Tainted blood scandal (United Kingdom)

References

External links 
 
 Factor 8: The Arkansas Prison Blood Scandal on BitChute - this has now been removed.
 Factor 8 website - this site is now up for sale.
 Youtube: Movie trailer
 BBC Radio 4 (audio) – You and Yours (special guest Kelly Duda)
 Japan Times: ″Blood battle is about the past and future″ - this is now captured on the WayBack Machine.
 BBC News: ″Blood campaigner in mail mystery″
 "Japan Premier Apologizes to Hepatitis C Victims Over Tainted Blood" - this New York Times article has mysteriously disappeared  been removed. .
 BBC News: "Haemophiliac Joins Clinton Demonstration"

American documentary films
Documentary films about HIV/AIDS
Documentary films about incarceration in the United States
Works about contaminated haemophilia blood products
HIV/AIDS in American films
2005 films
2000s American films